Alis Huws is a Welsh harpist from Powys, the sixth and current Official Harpist to the Prince of Wales.

Education
Huws is from Foel near Llanfair Caereinion in Powys, where she attended Ysgol Uwchradd Caereinion. Having received harp lessons at school, she continued her studies at the Royal Welsh College of Music and Drama in Cardiff, where she has since graduated with both undergraduate and master's degrees. Whilst there, she was awarded the Midori Matsui Prize for music, the Royal Welch Fusiliers Harp Prize and the McGrennery Chamber Music Prize.

Huws was a member of the National Youth Orchestra of Wales and in 2016 was principal harp in the WNO Youth Opera production of Kommilitonen! by Peter Maxwell Davies.

Career
In 2017 Huws performed alongside Katherine Jenkins and Only Men Aloud at an event celebrating the UEFA Champions League Final in Cardiff.

Having performed for the Royal Family on several occasions, she was appointed the Official Harpist to the Prince of Wales in July 2019.

References

1995 births
Living people
Welsh classical harpists
Alumni of the Royal Welsh College of Music & Drama
Women harpists
Welsh women musicians
21st-century Welsh musicians
21st-century classical musicians
21st-century British women musicians
People from Powys
Members of the Household of the Prince of Wales